The Henry Doremus House, also known as the Captain Thomas Doremus House, is a historic stone house located at 490 Main Road (U.S. Route 202) in the Towaco section of the township of Montville in Morris County, New Jersey. The oldest section was built . Listed as the Doremus House, it was added to the National Register of Historic Places on October 31, 1972, for its significance in architecture. It was later listed as the Henry Doremus House as part of the Dutch Stone Houses in Montville, New Jersey Multiple Property Submission (MPS) on January 17, 1992.

History and description
The one and one-half story stone house was built  by Henry Doremus, who later sold it to his brother Thomas Doremus. June 25–27, 1780, during the American Revolutionary War, the house was used as headquarters for General George Washington after the Battle of Springfield. August 26–28, 1781, the First Brigade of the French Army, the Expédition Particulière, under command of the French general Comte de Rochambeau, marched past this house, along the route to Yorktown, Virginia.

See also
 National Register of Historic Places listings in Morris County, New Jersey
 List of Washington's Headquarters during the Revolutionary War
 List of historic sites preserved along Rochambeau's route
 List of the oldest buildings in New Jersey

References

External links
 
 

Montville, New Jersey
Houses in Morris County, New Jersey
Houses on the National Register of Historic Places in New Jersey
National Register of Historic Places in Morris County, New Jersey
1760 establishments in New Jersey
New Jersey Register of Historic Places
Historic American Buildings Survey in New Jersey
Stone houses in New Jersey
Houses completed in 1760
Historic places on the Washington–Rochambeau Revolutionary Route